Larry Taylor (1942–2019) was an American bass guitarist.

Larry Taylor may also refer to:

Larry Taylor (actor) (1918–2003), British actor
Larry Taylor (gridiron football) (born 1985), American and Canadian football player
Larry Taylor (politician) (born 1960), member of the Texas Senate
Larry Gene Taylor (1953–2005), Missouri state senator
Larry Taylor (basketball) (born 1980), American and Brazilian basketball player
Larry Taylor (geochemist) (1938–2017), American geochemist and petrologist
Larry Taylor (footballer) (born 1947), English footballer

See also
Lawrence Taylor (disambiguation)
Laurie Taylor (disambiguation)